Tropical Storm Cristobal was a relatively weak tropical cyclone that meandered in the western Atlantic Ocean prior to being absorbed into a frontal zone. The third named storm of the 2002 Atlantic hurricane season, Cristobal developed on August 5 near the coast of South Carolina from the same trough that spawned Tropical Storm Bertha. The storm tracked slowly southeastward in the early portion of its duration, and initially remained disorganized. Cristobal attained peak winds of 50 mph (85 km/h), and lost the characteristics of a tropical cyclone on August 8. The remnants brought moderate precipitation to Bermuda, and in combination with a high pressure system the storm caused three drownings on Long Island from rip currents.

Meteorological history

A trough extended from the northern Gulf of Mexico to the western Atlantic Ocean in early August. The trough remained nearly stationary, spawning Tropical Storm Bertha in the Gulf of Mexico and a tropical disturbance off the coast of South Carolina. The weak low pressure area off South Carolina drifted southward, with its associated deep convection increasing in organization on August 4. By 1800 UTC on August 5, the system had acquired sufficient organization to be classified as Tropical Depression Three, while located about 175 miles (280 km/h) east-southeast of Charleston, South Carolina.

Upon becoming a tropical depression, the cyclone maintained outer rainbands and fair outflow. It tracked southeastward around the northeastern periphery of an anticyclone over Florida. By August 6, the convection had diminished as outflow became restricted due to northeasterly wind shear; with a relatively dry environment, most of the convection was confined to the southern semicircle of the depression. Despite the circulation becoming elongated in the southwesterly flow of a southward moving cold front, a Hurricane Hunters flight late on August 6 reported that the depression intensified into Tropical Storm Cristobal about 315 miles (505 km) east of Jacksonville, Florida.

Tropical Storm Cristobal initially continued tracking southeastward, with its circulation reforming closer to the thunderstorms during each increase in convection. On August 7 the storm turned eastward, due to the influence of a large approaching mid to upper-level frontal zone. As the convection organized further, Cristobal intensified somewhat and attained peak winds of 50 mph (85 km/h). On August 8, increased dry air weakened the convection and caused Cristobal to accelerate east-northeastward. The low-level circulation interacted with the approaching frontal zone, and by 0000 UTC on August 9 Tropical Storm Cristobal was absorbed by the cold front about 350 miles (560 km) southeast of Cape Hatteras, North Carolina. The remnants continued northeastward, passing near Newfoundland on August 10 before weakening near Greenland on August 14.

Impact
As a tropical cyclone, Cristobal had minimal effects on land. However, its remnants brought unsettled conditions to Bermuda, including a 45 mph (72 km/h) wind gust at the Bermuda International Airport. The combination of moisture from Cristobal and cold front into which it was absorbed produced 2.78 inches (71 mm) of rain there in a 24‑hour period. An annual powerboat race circumnavigating Bermuda had to be postponed by a week because of the adverse weather.

Although Cristobal remained offshore during its evolution, rough seas and rip currents were felt along portions of the U.S. East Coast. On August 9, lifeguards in Volusia County, Florida, rescued about 25 swimmers caught in rip currents. Offshore winds from the storm were credited with ending a widespread outbreak of jellyfish stings affecting bathers along the northern Atlantic coast of Florida. Some 1,000 stings had been reported.

Later, the extratropical remnants of Cristobal continued to interact with a high pressure system over the Mid-Atlantic states to generate dangerous swimming conditions further north. Along the south shore of Long Island, New York, significant wave heights reached 4 feet (1.2 m), and rip currents resulted in three drowning deaths on August 10: one in Montauk; one just east of Moriches Inlet; and one off Rockaway Beach. In the latter case, the victim had become exhausted after swimming out to save his son-in-law, an inexperienced swimmer, from the rip current.

See also

Other storms of the same name
List of Bermuda hurricanes
List of New York hurricanes

References

Cristobal
Cristobal (2002)
Cristobal (2002)
Cristobal (2002)
Cristobal